This is a timeline of crystallography.

18th Century
 1723 – Moritz Anton Cappeller introduces the term ‘crystallography’.
 1766 – Pierre-Joseph Macquer, in his Dictionnaire de Chymie, promotes mechanisms of crystallization based on the idea that crystals are composed of polyhedral molecules (primitive integrantes).
 1772 – Jean-Baptiste L. Romé de l'Isle develops geometrical ideas on crystal structure in his Essai de Cristallographie. He also described the twinning phenomenon in crystals.
 1781 – Abbé René Just Haüy (often termed the "Father of Modern Crystallography") discovers that crystals always cleave along crystallographic planes. Based on this observation, and the fact that the inter-facial angles in each crystal species always have the same value, Haüy concluded that crystals must be periodic and composed of regularly arranged rows of tiny polyhedra (molécules intégrantes). This theory explained why all crystal planes are related by small rational numbers (the law of rational indices).
 1783 – Jean-Baptiste L. Romé de l'Isle in the second edition of his Cristallographie uses the contact goniometer to discover the law of constant interfacial angles: angles are constant and characteristic for crystals of the same chemical substance.
 1784 – René Just Haüy publishes his Law of Decrements: a crystal is composed of molecules arranged periodically in three dimensions.
 1795 – René Just Haüy lectures on his Law of Symmetry: “[…] the manner in which Nature creates crystals is always obeying [...] the law of the greatest possible symmetry, in the sense that oppositely situated but corresponding parts are always equal in number, arrangement, and form of their faces”.

19th Century
 1801 – René Just Haüy publishes his multi-volume Traité de Minéralogie in Paris. A second edition under the title Traité de Cristallographie was published in 1822.
 1815 – René Just Haüy publishes his Law of Symmetry.
 1815 – Christian Samuel Weiss, founder of the dynamist school of crystallography, develops a geometric treatment of crystals in which crystallographic axes are the basis for classification of crystals rather than Haüy’s polyhedral molecules.
 1819 – Eilhard Mitscherlich discovers crystallographic isomorphism.
 1822 – Friedrich Mohs attempts to bring the molecular approach of Haüy and the geometric approach of Weiss into agreement.
 1823 – Franz Ernst Neumann invents a system of crystal face notation, by using the reciprocals of the intercepts with crystal axes, which becomes the standard for the next 60 years.
 1824 - Ludwig August Seeber conceives of the concept of using an array of discrete (molecular) points to represent a crystal.
 1826 - Moritz Ludwig Frankenheim derives the 32 crystal classes by using the crystallographic restriction, consistent with Haüy’s laws, that only 2, 3, 4 and 6-fold rotational axes are permitted.
 1830 - Johann F. C. Hessel publishes an independent geometrical derivation of the 32 point groups (crystal classes).
 1832 - Friedrich Wöhler and Justus von Liebig discovered polymorphism in molecular crystals, using the example of benzamide.
 1839 - William Hallowes Miller invents zonal relations by projecting the faces of a crystal upon the surface of a circumscribed sphere. Miller indices are defined which form a notation system in crystallography for planes in crystal (Bravais) lattices.
 1840 - Gabriel Delafosse, independently of Seeber, represents crystal structure as an array of discrete points generated by defined translations.
 1842 - Moritz Frankenheim derives 15 different theoretical networks of points in space not dependent on molecular shape.
 1848 - Louis Pasteur discovers that sodium ammonium tartrate can crystallize in left- and right-handed forms and showed that the two forms can rotate polarized light in opposite directions. This was the first demonstration of molecular chirality, and also the first explanation of isomerism.
 1850 - Auguste Bravais derives the 14 space lattices.
 1869 - Axel Gadolin, independently of Hessel, derives the 32 crystal classes using stereographic projection.
 1879 - Leonhard Sohncke lists the 65 crystallographic point systems using rotations and reflections in addition to translations.
 1891 - Derivation of the 230 space groups (by adding mirror-image symmetry to Sohncke’s work) by a collaborative effort of Evgraf Fedorov and Arthur Schoenflies.
 1894 - William Barlow, using a sphere packing approach, independently derives the 230 space groups.
 1895 - Wilhelm Conrad Röntgen on 8 November 1895 produced and detected electromagnetic radiation in a wavelength range now known as X-rays or Röntgen rays, an achievement that earned him the first Nobel Prize in Physics in 1901. X-rays became the major mode of crystallographic research in the 20th century.

20th Century
 1905 - Charles Glover Barkla discovered X-ray polarization effect.
 1908 - Bernhard Walter and Robert Wichard Pohl observed X-ray diffraction from a slit.
 1912 - Max von Laue discovers diffraction patterns from crystals in an x-ray beam.
 1912 - Bragg diffraction, expressed through Bragg’s law, is first presented by Lawrence Bragg on 11 November 1912 to the Cambridge Philosophical Society.
 1912 - Heinrich Baumhauer discovered and described polytypism in crystals of carborundum, or silicon carbide.
 1913 - Lawrence Bragg publishes the first observation of x-ray diffraction by crystals.
 1914 - Max von Laue wins the Nobel Prize in Physics "for his discovery of the diffraction of X-rays by crystals."
 1915 - William and Lawrence Bragg share the Nobel Prize in Physics "for their services in the analysis of crystal structure by means of X-rays."
 1916 - Peter Debye and Paul Scherrer discover powder (polycrystalline) diffraction.
 1917 - Alfred Hull independently discovers powder diffraction in researching the crystal structure of iron.
 1923 - Roscoe Dickinson and Albert Raymond, and independently, H.J. Gonell and H. Mark, first show that an organic molecule, specifically hexamethylenetetramine, could be characterized by x-ray crystallography.
 1923 - William H. Bragg and R.E. Gibbs elucidate the structure of quartz.
 1926 - Victor Goldschmidt distinguishes between atomic and ionic radii and postulates some rules for atom substitution in crystal structures.
 1928 - Felix Machatschki, working with Goldschmidt, shows that silicon can be replaced by aluminium in feldspar structures.
 1928 - Kathleen Lonsdale uses x-rays to determine that the structure of benzene is a flat hexagonal ring.
 1928 - Paul Niggli introduced reduced cells for simplifying structures using a technique now known as Niggli reduction.
 1929 - Linus Pauling formulated a set of rules to describe the structure of complex ionic crystals.
 1930 - Lawrence Bragg assembles the first classification of silicates, describing their structure in terms of grouping of SiO4 tetrahedra.
 1931 - Paul Ewald and Carl Hermann published the first volume of the Strukturbericht (Structure Report), which established the systematic classification of crystal structure prototypes, also known as the Strukturbericht designation.
 1932 - Friedrich Rinne introduced the concept of paracrystallinity for liquid crystals and amorphous materials.
 1934 - Arthur Patterson introduces the Patterson function which uses diffraction intensities to determine the interatomic distances within a crystal, setting limits to the possible phase values for the reflected x-rays.
 1934 - The first volumes in the series of International Tables for Crystallography are published.
 1936 - Peter Debye wins the Nobel Prize in Chemistry "for his contributions to our knowledge of molecular structure through his investigations on dipole moments and on the diffraction of X-rays and electrons in gases."
 1937 - Clinton Joseph Davisson and George Paget Thomson share the Nobel Prize in physics "for their experimental discovery of the diffraction of electrons by crystals."
 1945 - George W. Brindley and Keith Robinson solved the crystal structure of kaolinite.
 1946 - Foundation of the International Union of Crystallography.
 1946 - James Batcheller Sumner shares the Nobel Prize in Chemistry "for his discovery that enzymes can be crystallized".
 1947 - Lewis Stephen Ramsdell systematically classified the polytypes of silicon carbide, and introduced the Ramsdell notation.
 1949 - Clifford Shull opens a new field of magnetic crystallography based on neutron diffraction.
 1950 - Karle and Hauptman introduce useful formulae for phase determination, known as Direct Methods.
 1951 - Bijvoet and his colleagues, using anomalous scattering, confirm Emil Fischer’s arbitrary assignment of absolute configuration, in relation to the direction of optical rotation of polarized light, was correct in practice.
 1951 - Linus Pauling determines the structure of the α-helix and the β-sheet in polypeptide chains for which he won the 1954 Nobel prize in Chemistry.
 1952 - David Sayre suggests that the phase problem could be more easily solved by having at least one more intensity measurement beyond those of the Bragg peaks in each dimension. This concept is understood today as oversampling.
 1952 - Geoffrey Wilkinson and Ernst Otto Fischer determine the structure of ferrocene, the first metallic sandwich compound, for which they win the 1973 Nobel prize in Chemistry.
 1953 - Arne Magnéli introduced the term homologous series to describe polytypes of transition metal oxides that exhibit crystallographic shear structures.
 1953 - Determination of the structure of DNA by 3 British teams, for which Watson, Crick and Wilkins win the 1962 Nobel Prize in Physiology or Medicine in 1962 (Franklin’s death in 1958 made her ineligible for the award).
 1954 - Ukichiro Nakaya's book Snow Crystals: Natural and Artificial, dedicated to the modern study of snow crystals, is published.
 1954 - Linus Pauling wins the Nobel Prize in Chemistry "for his research into the nature of the chemical bond and its application to the elucidation of the structure of complex substances", specifically the determination of the structure of the α-helix and the β-sheet in polypeptide chains.”
 1956 - Durward W. J. Cruickshank developed the theoretical framework for anisotropic displacement parameters, also known as the thermal ellipsoid.
 1960 - John Kendrew determines the structure of myoglobin for which he shares the 1962 Nobel Prize in Chemistry.
 1960 - After many years of research, Max Perutz determines the structure of haemoglobin for which he shares the 1962 Nobel Prize in Chemistry.
 1962 - Michael Rossmann and David Blow lay the foundation for the molecular replacement approach which provides phase information without requiring additional experimental effort.
 1962 - Max Perutz and John Kendrew share the Nobel Prize for Chemistry "for their studies of the structures of globular proteins", namely haemoglobin and myoglobin respectively
 1962 - James Watson, Francis Crick and Maurice Wilkins win the Nobel Prize in Physiology or Medicine "for their discoveries concerning the molecular structure of nucleic acids and its significance for information transfer in living material," specifically for their determination of the structure of DNA.
 1964 - Dorothy Hodgkin wins the Nobel Prize for Chemistry "for her determinations by X-ray techniques of the structures of important biochemical substances." The substances included penicillin and vitamin B12.
 1967 - Hugo Rietveld invents the Rietveld refinement method for computation of crystal structures.
 1968 - Aaron Klug and David DeRosier use electron microscopy to visualise the structure of the tail of bacteriophage T4, a common virus, thus signalling a breakthrough in macromolecular structure determination.
 1968 - Dorothy Hodgkin, after 35 years of work, finally deciphers the structure of insulin.
 1971 - Establishment of the Protein Data Bank (PDB). At PDB, Edgar Meyer develops the first general software tools for handling and visualizing protein structural data.
 1973 - Alex Rich’s group publish the first report of a polynucleotide crystal structure - that of the yeast transfer RNA (tRNA) for phenylalanine.
 1973 - Geoffrey Wilkinson and Ernst Fischer share the Nobel Prize in Chemistry “for their pioneering work, performed independently, on the chemistry of the organometallic, so called sandwich compounds”, specifically the structure of ferrocene.
 1976 - William Lipscomb wins the Nobel Prize in Chemistry “for his studies on the structure of boranes illuminating problems of chemical bonding.”
 1978 - Stephen C. Harrison provides the first high-resolution structure of a virus: tomato bushy stunt virus which is icosahedral in form.
 1979 - The first award of the Gregori Aminoff Prize for a contribution in the field of crystallography is made by the Royal Swedish Academy of Sciences to Paul Peter Ewald.
 1980 - Jerome Karle and Wayne Hendrickson develop multi-wavelength anomalous dispersion (MAD) a technique to facilitate the determination of the three-dimensional structure of biological macromolecules via a solution of the phase problem.
 1982 - Aaron Klug wins the Nobel Prize in Chemistry “for his development of crystallographic electron microscopy and his structural elucidation of biologically important nucleic acid-protein complexes.”
 1984 - Dan Shechtman discovers quasicrystals for which he receives the Nobel Prize in Chemistry in 2011. These structures have no unit cell and no periodic translational order but have long-range bond orientational order, which generates a defined diffraction pattern.
 1984 - Aaron Klug and his colleagues provide an advance in determining the structure of protein–nucleic acid complexes when they solve the structure of the 206-kDa nucleosome core particle.
 1985 - Jerome Karle shares the Nobel Prize in Chemistry with Herbert A. Hauptman "for their outstanding achievements in the development of direct methods for the determination of crystal structures". Karle developed the theoretical basis for multiple-wavelength anomalous diffraction (MAD).
 1985 - Hartmut Michel and his colleagues report the first high-resolution X-ray crystal structure of an integral membrane protein when they publish the structure of a photosynthetic reaction centre. Michel, Deisenhofer and Huber share the 1988 Nobel Prize in Chemistry for this work.
 1986 - Ernst Ruska shares the Nobel Prize in Physics "for his fundamental work in electron optics, and for the design of the first electron microscope".
 1987 - John M. Cowley and Alexander F. Moodie share the first IUCr Ewald Prize "for their outstanding achievements in electron diffraction and microscopy. They carried out pioneering work on the dynamical scattering of electrons and the direct imaging of crystal structures and structure defects by high-resolution electron microscopy. The physical optics approach used by Cowley and Moodie takes into account many hundreds of scattered beams, and represents a far-reaching extension of the dynamical theory for X-rays, first developed by P.P. Ewald".
 1988 - Johann Deisenhofer, Robert Huber and Hartmut Michel share the Nobel Prize in Chemistry "for the determination of the three-dimensional structure of a photosynthetic reaction centre."
 1990 - Boris K. Vainshtein wins the second IUCr Ewald Prize "for his contributions to the development of theories and methods of structure analysis by electron and X-ray diffraction and for his applications of his theories to structural investigations of polymers, liquid crystals, peptides and proteins".
 1991 - Georg E. Schulz and colleagues report the structure of a bacterial porin, a membrane protein with a cylindrical shape (a ‘β-barrel’).
 1992 - The International Union of Crystallography changes the IUCr’s definition of a crystal to “any solid having an essentially discrete diffraction pattern” thus formally recognizing quasicrystals.
 1993 - Norio Kato wins the third IUCr Ewald Prize "for his outstanding and profound contributions to the dynamical theory of X-ray diffraction of spherical waves by perfect crystals and slightly deformed (nearly perfect) crystals, for the experimental exploitation of these theories towards the characterization of the defect structure of single crystals and for his extraordinary achievements in X-ray diffraction topography".
 1994 - Jan Pieter Abrahams et al. reported the structure of an F1-ATPase which uses the proton-motive force across the inner mitochondrial membrane to facilitate the synthesis of adenosine triphosphate (ATP).
 1994 - Bertram Brockhouse and Clifford Shull share the Nobel Prize in Physics "for pioneering contributions to the development of neutron scattering techniques for studies of condensed matter". Specifically, Brockhouse "for the development of neutron spectroscopy" and Shull "for the development of the neutron diffraction technique."
 1996 - Michael Rossmann wins the fourth IUCr Ewald Prize "for his work on molecular replacement and the use of non-crystallographic symmetry in the determination of macromolecular structure and for his research on the structure of viruses, which is foremost among the triumphs of crystallography".
 1997 - The X-ray crystal structure of bacteriorhodopsin was the first time the lipidic cubic phase (LCP) was used to facilitate the crystallization of a membrane protein; LCP has since been used to obtain the structures of many unique membrane proteins, including G protein-coupled receptors (GPCRs).
 1997 - Paul D. Boyer and John E. Walker share one half of the Nobel Prize in Chemistry "for their elucidation of the enzymatic mechanism underlying the synthesis of adenosine triphosphate (ATP)" Walker determined the crystal structure of ATP synthase, and this structure confirmed a mechanism earlier proposed by Boyer, mainly on the basis of isotopic studies.
 1999 - G. N. Ramachandran wins the fifth IUCr Ewald Prize "for his outstanding contributions to the field of crystallography: in the area of anomalous scattering and its use in the solution of the phase problem, in the analysis of the structure of fibres, collagen in particular, and, foremost, for his fundamental works on the macromolecular conformation and the validation of macromolecular structures by means of the 'Ramachandran plot', which even today remains the most useful validation tool".

21st Century
 2000 - Janos Hajdu, Richard Neutze, and colleagues calculated that they could use Sayre’s ideas from the 1950s, to implement a ‘diffraction before destruction’ concept, using an X-ray free-electron laser (XFEL).
 2001 - Harry F. Noller’s group publish the 5.5-Å structure of the complete Thermus thermophilus 70S ribosome. This structure revealed that the major functional regions of the ribosome were based on RNA, establishing the primordial role of RNA in translation.
 2001 - Roger Kornberg’s group publish the 2.8-Å structure of Saccharomyces cerevisiae RNA polymerase. The structure allowed both transcription initiation and elongation mechanisms to be deduced. Simultaneously, this group reported the structure of free RNA polymerase II, which contributed towards the eventual visualisation of the interaction between DNA, RNA, and the ribosome.
 2002 - Michael Woolfson wins the sixth IUCr Ewald Prize "for his exceptional contributions in developing the conceptual and theoretical framework of direct methods along with the algorithm design and computer programs for automatic solutions that changed the face of structural science and for his contributions to crystallographic education and international collaboration, which have strengthened the intellectual development of crystallographers worldwide".
 2005 - Philip Coppens wins the seventh IUCr Ewald Prize "for his contributions to developing the fields of electron density determination and the crystallography of molecular excited states, and for his contributions to the education and inspiration of young crystallographers as an enthusiastic teacher by participating in and organizing many courses and workshops".
 2007 - Two X-ray crystal structures of a GPCR, the human β2 adrenergic receptor, were published. Because many drugs elicit their biological effect(s) by binding to a GPCR, the structures of these and other GPCRs may be used to develop efficacious drugs with few side effects.
 2008 - David Sayre wins the eighth IUCr Ewald Prize "for the unique breadth of his contributions to crystallography, which range from seminal contributions to the solving of the phase problem to the complex physics of imaging generic objects by X-ray diffraction and microscopy, and for never losing touch with the physical reality of the processes involved".
 2009 - Venkatraman Ramakrishnan, Thomas A. Steitz and Ada E. Yonath share the Nobel Prize in Chemistry "for studies of the structure and function of the ribosome."
 2011 - Sandra Van Aert, Kees Joost Batenburg et. al. determined the 3D atomic positions of a silver nanoparticle using electron tomography.
 2011 - Dan Shechtman receives the Nobel Prize in chemistry "for the discovery of quasicrystals."
 2011 - Eleanor Dodson, Carmelo Giacovazzo and George M. Sheldrick share the ninth IUCr Ewald Prize "for the enormous impact they have made on structural crystallography through the development of new methods that have then been made available to users as constantly maintained and extended software. Their invaluable contributions to computational crystallography have resulted in the leading program suites CCP4, SIR and SHELX, respectively. All over the world thousands of crystallographers benefit from their achievements on a daily basis".
 2014 - Aloysio Janner and Ted Janssen share the tenth IUCr Ewald Prize "for the development of superspace crystallography and its application to the analysis of aperiodic crystals".
 2017 - Jacques Dubochet, Joachim Frank and Richard Henderson share the Nobel Prize in chemistry "for developing cryo-electron microscopy for the high-resolution structure determination of biomolecules in solution.""
 2017 - Tom Blundell wins the eleventh IUCr Ewald Prize "for his work as one of the worldwide leaders in crystallographic innovation, especially at the interface with life sciences; starting with his work on determining the structure of insulin with Dorothy Hodgkin, he determined an exceptionally broad array of medically critical human protein structures, championing methods enabling drug design and discovery through structural optimization, crystallographic fragment screening, and computational modelling, and for being a leader in advanced crystallographic education internationally".
 2021 - Olga Kennard wins the twelfth IUCr Ewald Prize "for her invaluable pioneering contribution to the development of crystallographic databases, in particular the Cambridge Structural Database (CSD)".

References

Further reading
 Authier, André (2013), Early Days of X-ray Crystallography, Oxford Univ. Press
 Burke, John G. (1966), Origins of the Science of Crystals, University of California Press
 Ewald, P. P. (ed.) (1962), 50 Years of X-ray Diffraction, IUCR, Oosthoek
 Kubbinga, H. (2012), Crystallography from Haüy to Laue: controversies on the molecular and atomistic nature of solids, Z. Kristallogr. 227, 1–26
 Lima-de-Faria, José (ed.) (1990), Historical atlas of crystallography, Springer Netherlands
 Milestones in Crystallography, Nature, August 2014
 Whitlock, H.P. (1934). A Century of Progress in Crystallography, The American Mineralogist, 19, 93-100

Crystallography
Physics timelines